Against All Odds is an album by the British punk rock band Conflict. It was released in 1989 by Mortarhate Records.

Track listing
"Against All Odds" – 14:09
"Slaughter Of Innocence" – 4:30
"Assured Mutual Destruction" – 2:39
"The Greatest Show On Earth" – 3:19
"A Message To Who" – 3:32
"A State Of Mind" – 4:56

References

Conflict (band) albums
1989 albums